Wild Palms is a five-hour miniseries which was produced by Greengrass Productions and first aired in May 1993 on the ABC network in the United States. The sci-fi drama, announced as an "event series", deals with the dangers of politically motivated abuse of mass media technology and virtual realities in particular. It was based on a comic strip written by Bruce Wagner and illustrated by Julian Allen first published in 1990 in Details magazine. Wagner, who also wrote the screenplay, served as executive producer together with Oliver Stone. The series stars James Belushi, Dana Delany, Robert Loggia, Kim Cattrall, Bebe Neuwirth, David Warner, and Angie Dickinson. The episodes were directed by Kathryn Bigelow, Keith Gordon, Peter Hewitt and Phil Joanou.

Plot synopsis
In the United States in the near future of 2007, a right-wing political group called the Fathers dominate large sections of American politics and the media. A libertarian movement called the Friends opposes the government, often making use of underground guerrilla tactics. The Fathers' leader is California Senator Tony Kreutzer, who is also the leader of the Scientology-like Church of Synthiotics and the owner of the Wild Palms media group. Kreutzer's Channel 3 TV station is about to launch its first VR program Church Windows, a sitcom that projects characters into viewers' homes as holograms using a system called Mimecom.

Harry Wyckoff is a successful patent attorney living in Beverly Hills, California on the brink of becoming a partner in the law firm where he works. He has two children with his wife Grace, a perfect housewife who also moonlights as a boutique owner. His 11-year-old son Coty is a precocious child actor who has just been cast for Church Windows while Deirdre, his 4-year-old daughter, has been mute since birth. His mother-in-law is the impossibly chic socialite and artist Josie Ito, a woman of strong will and numerous social and political connections. At night, Harry is plagued by strange dreams of a rhinoceros and a faceless woman who has palm trees tattooed on her body.

One day, Harry is visited by a former lover of his college days - the alluring Paige Katz. Paige asks for his help in tracking down her 12-year-old son Peter, who disappeared five years earlier. Paige is closely associated with the Wild Palms media group, which Harry's firm is going up against in court. Harry is passed over for a promotion due to the seeming conflict of interest when it is revealed that Paige works as the public relations director at Wild Palms. After this, Harry quits his job and gladly accepts when Kreutzer offers him a job at Channel 3 with a much higher salary.

Harry's wife Grace becomes alienated by his lingering interest in Paige and attempts suicide. To his dismay, Harry learns that Coty is actually the son of Kreutzer and Paige, and that her search request was a plot to bring him and the Senator together. After Church Windows is aired, Coty becomes not only a TV star but also — due to his privileged upbringing and personal ruthlessness — a high-ranking member of the Church of Synthiotics. Josie turns out to be the Senator's sister who disposes of potential rivals with the same violently brutal means as her brother. Her only weak point is her affection for her estranged husband Eli Levitt, leader of the Friends and Grace's father who is currently in prison.

Kreutzer plans to marry Paige and tries to get hold of the Go chip, an advanced microchip which would enable him to become an immortal living hologram. He uses all means possible to acquire the chip, but Paige is disgusted by his methods and gives information to the Friends. Meanwhile, Harry finally finds Paige's son Peter, who is living on the streets having run away from home. Harry discovers that Peter, who has connections to the Friends, is his real son who was taken away by the Fathers shortly after his birth. Kreutzer, who suspects Harry of collaborating with his opponents, has him tortured, and kidnaps Deirdre, while Josie strangles Grace.

Harry joins the Friends and uses his access to Channel 3 to broadcast a Mimecom recording of Grace's murder that causes a social uproar in order to bring down the Fathers. Synthiotics facilities and the campaign offices of Kreutzer (who is now running for president) are attacked. The Fathers try unsuccessfully to defuse the situation by killing Eli and broadcasting a fake video that depicts Harry as Grace's killer. Josie ends up being brutally killed by a former victim, Tully Woiwode. Kreutzer finally manages to get hold of the Go chip and has it implanted, but not before it is secretly altered by Harry and Peter. Kreutzer reveals to Harry that he is his biological father, then loses cohesion and dissolves into nothingness. Harry and Paige rescue Dierdre from Coty who has now taken Kreutzer's place as the leader of the Fathers and the Church of Synthiotics. In the end, Harry, Paige, Peter and Dierdre pack up and flee from the civil unrest happening all over Los Angeles and they safely drive away into the sunset on a nearby beach.

Episodes
ABC aired the miniseries over five consecutive nights:
 1993-05-16: Everything Must Go (approx. 90 minutes) - directed by Peter Hewitt
 1993-05-17: The Floating World (approx. 45 minutes) - directed by Keith Gordon
 1993-05-18: Rising Sons (approx. 45 minutes) - directed by Kathryn Bigelow
 1993-05-19: Hungry Ghosts (approx. 45 minutes) - directed by Keith Gordon
 1993-05-20: Hello, I Must Be Going (approx. 45 minutes) - directed by Phil Joanou

Cast
 James Belushi as Harry Wyckoff, a Beverly Hills based patent attorney and later, CEO of the Wild Palms group.
 Dana Delany as Grace Wyckoff, his wife, suburban housewife and owner of Hiroshima, a retro fashion boutique.
 Ben Savage as Coty Wyckoff, their 11-year-old son, a child actor on the verge of a breakthrough to stardom.
 Robert Loggia as Senator Tony Kreutzer, former sci-fi author, founder of the Wild Palms group and the Synthiotics cult.
 Angie Dickinson as Josie Ito, Grace's mother, a celebrated interior decorator with numerous connections and secrets.
 David Warner as Eli Levitt, Grace's father, former history professor imprisoned for terrorism. Founder of the Friends.
 Kim Cattrall as Paige Katz, PR director of the Wild Palms group, Harry's former love and Kreutzer's fiancée.
 Ernie Hudson as Tommy Laszlo, Harry Wyckoff's childhood friend, an eccentric entrepreneur.
 Nick Mancuso as Tully Woiwode, infamous and popular painter and toast-of-the-town, Tommy's secret lover.
 Bebe Neuwirth as Tabba Schwartzkopf, Academy Award-winning actress who befriends Grace, and is part of the Wild Palms group.
 Aaron Michael Metchik as Peter, a street urchin with mysterious connections to Harry, Grace and the Fathers.
 Brad Dourif as Chickie Levitt, Eli Levitt's son from another relationship. Virtual reality boy genius and technology wizard.
 Charles Hallahan as Gavin Whitehope, Harry's associate at the Wild Palms group. Reformed alcoholic and Synthiotics devotee.
 Robert Morse as Chap Starfall, erstwhile pop star reduced to lounge singer status until the Wild Palms group revives him.
 Beata Pozniak as Tambor, the Wyckoffs' dutiful au-pair.
 Bob Gunton as Dr. Tobias Schenkl, Harry's psychiatrist.
 Rondi Reed as Eileen Whitehope, Gavin's wife, a "Lady-who-lunches" who also alerts Grace to a danger in her own home.
 Charles Rocket as Stitch Walken, a stand-up comedian who is also a surreptitious agent of the Friends.
 Eugene Lee as Lt. Bob Grindrod, a corrupt LAPD detective under contract to the Wild Palms group.
 François Chau as Hiro, Grace's childhood sweetheart from her years spent in Japan, and an enemy of Kreutzer.
 Monica Mikala as Deirdre Wyckoff, Harry and Grace's silent four-year-old daughter, who gets kidnapped and used as a pawn later on.

Cameos
 Cyberpunk author William Gibson has a cameo appearance as himself. When the author is introduced as the man who invented the term Cyberspace, he remarks, "and they won't let me forget it".
 Wild Palms producer and film director Oliver Stone also has a cameo. In a fictitious interview he appears as himself and comments on the release of files pertinent to the assassination of John F. Kennedy, revealing that the theories in his film JFK were right.
 Wild Palms director Kathryn Bigelow has an uncredited cameo. She plays the character Maisy Woiwode.

Production
Oliver Stone had originally planned to film Bruce Wagner's novel Force Majeure, but then decided to film Wagner's comic strip Wild Palms, published in Details magazine, instead: "It was so syncretic.  It was such a fractured view of the world. Everything and anything could happen. Maybe your wife isn't your wife, maybe your kids aren't your kids. It really appealed to me." Wagner referred to his creation as "a sort of surreal diary […] a tone poem", set in an "Orwellian Los Angeles". ABC agreed to finance the project on a budget of $11 million, but, remembering the eventual decline of David Lynch's Twin Peaks, insisted that the series had "a complete story, with a beginning, a middle, and an end".

Actor James Belushi compared the series (among others) to the British TV serial The Prisoner, and stated: "It's very tough, very challenging—a lot of viewers probably won't dig it." Dana Delany suggested that viewers should "let it wash over you, enjoy each scene, and by the end it'll make sense". Robert Loggia compared it to the Elizabethan play The Duchess of Malfi and the ancient Greek tragedy Medea. ABC, bound to make sure that viewers wouldn't lose attention, had a supplemental book, The Wild Palms Reader, published and offered a telephone hotline with the show's initial run. These measures notwithstanding, Stone considered the atmosphere to be more important than the storyline.

William Gibson later stated that "while the mini-series fell drastically short of the serial, it did produce one admirably peculiar literary artifact, The Wild Palms Reader" (to which he contributed). Both Stone and Gibson called Wagner the creative force behind the series.

Production design
The United States of the year 2007 as depicted in the series shows a strong influence of Japanese culture, such as in dress and interior and exterior design. Holograms of Miss Alabama and girl group The Supremes even bear Japanese facial features.

Other interior details show the influence of Scottish designer and architect Charles Rennie Mackintosh (1868–1928). Deliberately anachronistic elements include 1960s cars (like Studebaker police vehicles) and Edwardian fashion. Cerruti 1881 provided costumes.

Supplements

Soundtrack album
In addition to Ryuichi Sakamoto's music score, a number of 1960s rock and pop songs and classical compositions could be heard in the series. On the 1993 released soundtrack album, the following songs were included besides Sakamoto's music:
 The Zombies: She's Not There
 Don Gardner & Dee Dee Ford: I Need Your Lovin'
 Frankie Valli: Can't Take My Eyes Off You
 Lou Christie: Lightnin' Strikes
 Mason Williams: Classical Gas

The following songs and compositions can be heard in the series but are not featured on the album:
 The Animals: The House of the Rising Sun
 Ludwig van Beethoven: Symphony No. 7 in A major, Op. 92, Second Movement
 The 5th Dimension: Wedding Bell Blues
 The Rolling Stones: Gimme Shelter
 The Rolling Stones: No Expectations
 The Supremes: Love Child
 Richard Wagner: Parsifal, Prelude

Books
A book, The Wild Palms Reader, was published by St. Martin's Press before the series aired. It included time lines, secret letters, and character biographies. ABC, concerned that viewers might get "hopelessly lost in the tangled story line", arranged for the primer to be published. It also included writing supposedly from the "world of the series".  Contributors included:
 Norman Spinrad – sci-fi writer (Bug Jack Barron, The Iron Dream)
 Genesis P. Orridge (anonymous) – musician (Psychic TV, Throbbing Gristle)
 E. Howard Hunt – CIA officer involved in the Watergate Scandal, writer of spy/sci-fi novels
 William Gibson – sci-fi writer
 Brenda Laurel – virtual reality consultant on the mini-series
 Spain Rodriguez – 1960s underground comic artist (Trashman)
 Hans Moravec – scientist and writer in the artificial intelligence field
While the comic series was published in book form in Germany, the Wild Palms Reader was not. Instead, a novelization, written by German dime novel author Horst Friedrichs, was published under the title Wild Palms.

Reception
Reviews of the series were mixed.

The New York Times critic John J. O'Connor called Wild Palms a "truly wild six-hour mini-series" resembling "nothing so much as an acid freak's fantasy, drenched in paranoia and more pop-culture allusions than a Dennis Miller monologue."  He described it as "rich and insinuating as a good theatrical film, albeit harder to follow" and concluded, "You wanted something different? Here it is. And Wild Palms also happens to be terrific."

Ken Tucker in Entertainment Weekly stated that "in its length, scope, sweeping visual tableaux, and over-the-top passion, Wild Palms is more like an opera than a TV show." Comparing it to David Lynch's Twin Peaks, he decided that "unlike Peaks, which started out brilliantly lucid and then rambled into incoherence, Palms sustains its length and adds layers of complexity to its characters. It also has something crucial that Peaks did not: a sense of humor about itself."

Mary Harron of the British Independent suggested that viewers "forget about the message, and about what the rhino means. Wild Palms should be watched like opera; for its gorgeous images, its emotional set-pieces and its high style."

Readers of the British trade weekly Broadcast were much more negative, calling it one of the worst television shows ever exported by the U.S. to the U.K.  It placed fourth on their list, exceeded only by Baywatch, The Anna Nicole Show and The Dukes of Hazzard. TV Guide also blasted it, offering the interpretation that Oliver Stone was condemning television while covertly lauding cinematic films.

Home media
 Wild Palms was released on VHS cassette in the UK by BBC in 1993, where it aired between November 15 and December 7 the same year.
 It was first released on CLV laserdisc in the U.S. in March 1995. The series was released on VHS on February 8, 2000 on two separate VHS tapes. 
 It was released as a Region 4 DVD in Australia in 2004, a Region 1 DVD in the U.S. on October 4, 2005 by MGM Home Entertainment, and a Region 2 DVD in the UK in 2008.
 It was re-released as a two-disk DVD special edition and on blu-ray for the first time by Kino International on June 30, 2020.

References

External links 
 
 

1990s American science fiction television series
1993 American television series debuts
1993 American television series endings
American Broadcasting Company original programming
Television shows based on comic strips
Television shows about virtual reality
Television series set in 2007
Television shows set in Los Angeles